Cristina Bucșa and Yana Sizikova were the defending champions, but both players chose not to participate.

Irina Khromacheva and Nina Stojanović won the title, defeating Valentini Grammatikopoulou and Renata Zarazúa in the final, 6–1, 6–4.

Seeds

Draw

Draw

References
Main Draw

BBVA Open Ciudad de Valencia - Doubles